The pyramid of Amenemhat I is an Egyptian burial structure built at Lisht by the founder of the Twelfth Dynasty of Egypt, Amenemhat I. 

This structure returned to the approximate size and form of Old Kingdom pyramids. It also established a new tradition though of giving each component structure in the pyramid complex its own unique name. The structures together were known as "The places of the appearances of Amenemhat".

Construction 
Archaeological evidence suggests that Amenemhat started to build his pyramid at Thebes but for unknown reasons switched his capital and the location of his pyramid to Lisht (1991–1778 BC). The pyramid upon its completion rose to a height of 55 m, with a base length of 83 m and a slope of 54 degrees. The core of the pyramid was made with small rough blocks of local limestone with a loose fill of sand debris and mud brick. Some of the limestone was stripped from other monuments - blocks of stone from the pyramids of Khufu, Khafre, Unas and Pepi II (or possibly Pepi I) have been found in the pyramid. Inside the pyramid a sloped shaft blocked with granite plugs upon burial ran from the ground level entrance chapel to a vertical shaft that descended directly to the burial chamber. The overall construction of the pyramid was poor and little of it remains today.

Around the pyramid were found tombs of high officials serving the king. These include the tombs of the high steward Nakht, the treasurer Rehuerdjersen and the vizier Intefiqer.

Excavation
The first excavation of the site was undertaken by the French Egyptologist Gaston Maspero in 1882. His work as later continued by a French archaeological expedition under the direction of J.E. Gautier and Gustave Jéquier in 1894 and 1895. The investigations were continued from 1920 to 1934 by Albert Lythgoe and Arthur Mace in a team from the Metropolitan Museum in New York City. By the time of these excavations the pyramid had undergone much disintegration and is now only 20 meters high with most of the surrounding complex gone. None of the expeditions successfully explored the interior of the pyramid due to the internal passageways being flooded with groundwater.

See also 
Egyptian pyramid construction techniques
List of Egyptian pyramids
Lepsius list of pyramids
 Pyramid of Senusret I

References

Sources

External links 
Pyramid of Amenemhet I at el-Lisht

Amenemhat I
Lisht
Buildings and structures completed in the 20th century BC
20th century BC in Egypt
Amenemhat I